American: The Bill Hicks Story is a 2009 biographical documentary film on the life of comedian Bill Hicks. The film was produced by Matt Harlock and Paul Thomas, and features archival footage and interviews with family and friends, including Kevin Booth.

The filmmakers used a cut-and-paste animation technique to add movement to a large collection of still pictures used to document events in Hicks' life.

Release
The film made its North American premiere at the 2010 South by Southwest Film Festival.

Reception

Critical response
On Rotten Tomatoes, 82% of the 55 reviews were rated positive. The critical consensus was: "A treasure trove of archival material and interviews, American: The Bill Hicks Story is an exuberant celebration about a unique, sorely missed voice in comedy."

Accolades
American was nominated for a 2010 Grierson British Documentary Award for the "Most Entertaining Documentary" category.
It was also nominated for Best Graphics and Animation category in the 2011 Cinema Eye Awards. Awards won include The Dallas Film Festivals Texas Filmmaker Award, at Little Rock The Oxford American's Best Southern Film Award, at Biografilm, Bologna, Italy The Lancia Award and Best Documentary at the Downtown LA Film Festival.

References

External links
 
 
 "Animating the real Bill Hicks", interview with the directors, discussing the creation of the film, Shehani Fernando and Henry Barnes, guardian.co.uk, 11 May 2010
 "Film Review: American: The Bill Hicks Story", Andrew Pulver, guardian.co.uk, 13 May 2010
 "American: the Bill Hicks Story, review ", Tim Robey, telegraph.co.uk, 14 May 2010
 "Review: American: the Bill Hicks Story", The Sunday Times, 14 May 2010

2009 films
2009 documentary films
2009 independent films
Films set in Texas
British biographical films
British documentary films
British independent films
Documentary films about comedy and comedians
Variance Films films
2000s English-language films
2000s British films